Les Gens du Quai (in English People of the Quay) is a Contemporary dance company founded in 1993 in Montpellier, France.

It is directed by its co-founders, Anne Lopez (choreographer, dancer) and François Lopez (composer, performer), who are brother and sister.

Besides their choreographic creations, performances and concerts, the Gens du Quai offer workshops in schools, medico-educational or psychiatric institutions.

Anne Lopez, who received in 2004 the prize of the new choreographic talent of the Société des Auteurs et Compositeurs Dramatiques for her piece De l'avant invariablement, is also a teacher and a lecturer.

Works

Choreographic creations 
 Paradox (2016)
 Trident (2016)
 Celui d'à côté (2015)
 Comment j'ai réussi à ne pas aplatir mon mari (2015)
 Miracle (2013)
 Mademoiselle Lopez (solo, 2012)
 Feu à volonté (2010)
 Duel (2009)
 La Menace (2008)
 Idiots mais Rusés (2007)
 Face à vous (2005)
 De l'avant invariablement (2004)
 Litanies (2002)
 De l'autre (solo, 2002)
 Révoltes (2000)
 Écoute œnone (solo, 1999)
 L'Invité (1999)
 Meeting (1998)

Performances 

 Le Grand Direct (2009)
 Potlatch
 Organic
 Pixels
 Vox populi
 Petite ligne
 La Ligne jaune

Films 
 10 Petits Danseurs
 Les Géographes, ceux qui écrivent l'espace

Web 
 Menace-TV

Concert 
 Le Concert Insolite (Frédéric Tari & François Lopez)

Distribution 
Except their country of origin, the Gens du Quai showed their work:
 in  :
 Duel, for the 2014 Black Box International Festival in Plovdiv,
 Le Concert insolite, during the 2015 Black Box International Festival,
 Comment j'ai réussi à ne pas aplatir mon mari, for the same festival's opening,

References 

Content in this edit is translated from the existing French Wikipedia article at :fr:Les Gens du Quai; see its history for attribution.

External links 
 The company's website

Contemporary dance companies
Dance in France
Organizations based in Montpellier